The 2005–06 Serie D was the fifty-eighth edition of the top level Italian non-professional football championship. It represented the fifth tier in the Italian football league system.

List of teams

Girone A

Girone B

Girone C

Girone D 
Note: In 2005-06, the Girone D was composed of 20 teams instead of the canonical 18 ones.

Girone E

Girone F

Girone G

Girone H

Girone I

Division winners
All teams promoted to 2006–07 Serie C2

Promotion playoffs

First round
Single-legged matches played at best placed club home field

Second round
Single-legged matches played at best placed club home field

Third round (group stage)

Group 1

Group 2

Group 3

Semi-finals
Winning teams are automatically promoted to Serie C2

Final

Relegations

Girone A
Chiari
Cossatese
Vigevano

Girone B
Bergamo Cenate
Caratese
Caravaggio
Oggiono

Girone C
Centese
Crevalcore
Meletolese

Girone D
Cologna Veneta
Cordignano
Manzanese
Vallagarina

Girone E
Rondinella
Venturina

Girone F
Frascati
Urbino

Girone G
Aprilia
Montenero
Sorianese
Spes Mentana

Girone H
Ariano Irpino
Manduria
San Paolo Bari
Sologra
Nuovo Terzigno

Girone I
Alcamo
Scillese
Trapani

External links
2005–06 Serie D at RSSSF

Serie D seasons
5
Italy